The Bell Tower of Xi'an, built in 1384 during the early Ming Dynasty, is a symbol of the city of Xi'an and one of the grandest of its kind in China. The Bell Tower also contains several large bronze-cast bells from the Tang Dynasty. It is located in the center of Xi'an, at the intersection of the four streets of the east, west, south and north. It is the largest and most preserved one amongst the many bell towers left over from ancient China.

History
Xi'an Bell Tower was built in the 17th year of Hongwu in the Ming Dynasty (1384). It was originally located at the Yingxiang Temple (迎祥观) of Guangji Street, north of West Street, facing the Xi'an Drum Tower, about one kilometer away from its current location. At that time, this place was directly opposite the north and south city gates, and it was the center of the city. With the expansion of Chang'an City in the early Ming Dynasty, the city center gradually moved eastward. After two centuries, the city gate was rebuilt, and the new four streets of East, South, West, and North were formed. The bell tower at Yingxiang Temple seemed to deviate from the center of the city.

In 1582, under the auspices of Shaanxi Provincial Supervision Officer Gong Yuxian, the county magistrates of Xianning and Chang'an were ordered to relocate them to the present site. In addition to rebuilding the pedestal, the construction of the intrinsic structure is all original, so the cost is not much and the project is rapid. But the overall migration of such a huge building more than 600 years ago is rare in the history of world architecture. Gong Yuxian's "" recorded the details of the migration project.

In 1699, 1740 and 1840, Xi'an Bell Tower was repaired on a large scale. Among them, in 1740, the governor Zhang Wei rebuilt according to the original structure and found that the house covered with Jingyun bell was so airtight that the bell sounded "not to be out" and the sound outside was small. Therefore, the Tang Dynasty "Jing Yun" bell, which was originally suspended in the room, was removed from the outdoors, so that the sound of the time was far-reaching, and he wrote "".

On October 10, 1939, the Xi'an Bell Tower was bombed by Japanese planes and was seriously damaged. After the bell tower was bombed, the Xijing Municipal Construction Committee Engineering Office repaired it.

After the founding of the People's Republic of China, Xi'an Bell Tower was overhauled five times. In August 1956, it was listed in the Shaanxi Provincial People's Government as the first batch of key cultural relics protection units in Shaanxi Province. It was officially opened to the public in 1984. In November 1996, it was included in the national key cultural relics protection unit.

Function
Similar to other Chinese clock towers, Xi'an Bell Tower was mainly used for time reporting and publishing news in ancient times. With the progress of the times, its traditional functions have been gradually phased out, and now it is open to the society as a national-level cultural relics protection unit for tourism and sightseeing. Visitors can purchase tickets to visit the building.

It has also been used for many other purposes in history. During the Revolution of 1911, the Rebels fought fiercely with the Qing army deployed here. During the War of Protecting the Nation, the Shaanxi Warlord Chen Shupan started the riots against Yuan Shikai from here. In 1927, Shilin, who came back from studying in the United States, opened a sound cinema here. This is the first cinema in Xi'an history. During the Anti-Japanese War, the Xi’an Bell Tower became an alarm station for warning the Japanese air raids because of its high terrain. The GuoMingDang also used its four-door door to imprison criminals. During the period after the founding of the People's Republic of China, it became the rostrum of the parade, review and celebrations on Labor Day and National Day.

Architectural features

Form
The lower part of the Xi'an Bell Tower is a square-shaped pedestal with a masonry structure. The surface is made of blue brick and the base is a two-story wooden structure. The height from the ground to the top of the building is 36 meters, of which the base is 8.6 meters high. Each side is 35.5 meters long and has a construction area of about 1,377.4 square meters. There are stairs inside to hover up. The overall style is typical of the Ming Dynasty architectural style. The top is a triple-sided four-sided spire structure supported by a brawl. The top part is the “golden top” of the real gold platinum wrapped in the inner heart of the wood. The dark green roof tiles are covered with dark green glazed tiles, and the interior is decorated with gold paintings. In the middle of the pedestal, there are holes intersecting each other with a cross of about 6 meters. In the past, there were passages for the intersection of four streets in the southeast and northwest, and pedestrian vehicles passed through the cave. With the development of urban construction, the hole can not adapt to the traffic flow needs, and now the hole has been closed. There is a road turntable around the clock tower, and there is a circular passage for the pedestrians underground.

Emboss
The door and window carvings of the Xi’an Bell Tower are exquisite and complex, showing the decorative arts prevailing in the Ming and Qing Dynasties. There are 8 reliefs on each door leaf.

Cultural relics

Giant Bell
The original giant bell of Xi'an Bell Tower was the "JingYun" bell cast by the year of Jingyun in the Tang Dynasty. It was originally used by Jinglong temple in Chang'an City (currently in Xi'an West Street today). It was moved to Xi'an Bell Tower in the early Ming Dynasty. In 1953, JingYun bell moved to Xi'an Beilin Museum and is now on display in Dongting.

The Xi'an Municipal Bureau of Cultural Relics copied the Jingyun Zhong. It was hung on the northwest corner of the base of the Xi'an Bell Tower on January 30, 1997 and is now open to tourists. The imitation Jingyun bell looks similar to the original bell. The height is 2.45 meters, the weight is 6.5 tons, and the outer diameter of the bell skirt is 1.65 meters. The ornamentation and inscription resemble the original bell, and the sound quality is bright and majestic.

Inscription
The west wall of the first floor hall of Xi'an Bell Tower is inlaid with three inscriptions. The first one is the inscription on the inscription after the Xi'an Municipal People's Government renovated the clock tower in 1953. The second one is the Shaanxi governor Zhang Yishu after the five-year major overhaul by the Qianlong Emperor. The "" monument was written; the third is the "" monument written by the Shaanxi Provincial Supervision Officer Gong Yuxian.

Couplet
On the second floor of Xi'an Bell Tower, there is a couplet on each sides of the doorpost, and they are all added recently.

Legends
There are several legends regarding the Bell Tower, one of them tells:

According to another legend:

See also 
Bell Tower Hotel

References

External links

Bell Tower, Xi'an China

Buildings and structures completed in 1384
Towers completed in the 14th century
Major National Historical and Cultural Sites in Shaanxi
Buildings and structures in Xi'an
Tourist attractions in Xi'an
Bell towers